The 2020 ITTF-ATTU Asian Cup would have been the 33rd edition of the annual table tennis competition that was initially scheduled to be held from 28 February to 1 March in Hainan, China. On 31 January 2020, it was announced that the event would be postponed until a later date, due to the COVID-19 pandemic. On 4 September 2020, as part of the International Table Tennis Federation's announcement regarding the return of international table tennis, it was confirmed that the event had been cancelled.

See also

2020 Europe Top 16 Cup
2020 ITTF Pan-America Cup

References

External links
 Tournament page on ITTF website

Asian Cup (table tennis)
Asian Cup
ITTF-ATTU Asian Cup
ITTF-ATTU Asian Cup
Table tennis competitions in China
ITTF